The 1876 Democratic National Convention assembled in St. Louis just nine days after the conclusion of the Republican National Convention in Cincinnati.

This was the first political convention held west of the Mississippi River. St. Louis was notified in February 1876 that it had been selected. Among the events was a fireworks display from the top of the Old Courthouse.

Proceedings 
The convention was called to order by Democratic National Committee chairman Augustus Schell. Henry Watterson served as the temporary convention chairman and John Alexander McClernand, a retired congressman and major general, served as permanent convention president.

Platform 
The Democratic platform pledged to replace the corruption of the Grant administration with honest, efficient government and to end "the rapacity of carpetbag tyrannies" in the South; called for treaty protection for naturalized U.S. citizens visiting their homeland, restrictions on Oriental immigration, and tariff reform; and opposed land grants to railroads.

Presidential nomination

Presidential candidates 

The 12th Democratic National Convention assembled in St. Louis in June 1876. Five thousand people jammed the auditorium in St. Louis, hoping for the Democrats' first presidential victory in 20 years. The platform called for immediate and sweeping reforms following the scandal-plagued Grant administration.

Six names were placed in nomination: Samuel J. Tilden, Thomas A. Hendricks, Winfield Scott Hancock, William Allen, Thomas F. Bayard, and Joel Parker. Tilden won more than 400 votes on the first ballot, a strong showing, but less than the 492 required by the convention's two-thirds rule. He won the nomination by a landslide on the second ballot. Although Tilden was strongly opposed by "Honest John" Kelly, the leader of New York's Tammany Hall, he was still able to obtain the nomination. According to contemporary accounts, Tilden's nomination was received by the delegates with more enthusiasm than that of any nominee since Andrew Jackson.

Source: Official proceedings of the National Democratic convention, held in St. Louis, Mo., June 27th, 28th and 29th, 1876. (September 3, 2012).

Vice Presidential nomination

Vice Presidential candidate 

Delegates proposed various potential candidates for vice president, including William R. Morrison of Illinois, chairman of the House Committee on Ways and Means. The Ohio delegation considered nominating U.S. Representative Henry B. Payne. However, the feeling of unanimity was so great that the Ohio delegates instead seconded the nomination of Hendricks. Hendricks was the only nominee, and won the nomination nearly unanimously on the first ballot, with the only exceptions being eight abstentions from Ohio.

Source: Official proceedings of the National Democratic convention, held in St. Louis, Mo., June 27th, 28th and 29th, 1876. (September 3, 2012).

See also 
 1876 Republican National Convention
 List of Democratic National Conventions
 U.S. presidential nomination convention
 1876 United States presidential election
 History of the United States Democratic Party

References

Further reading 
 Haworth, Paul Leland. The Hayes-Tilden disputed presidential election of 1876 (1895) online.
 Holt, Michael F. By One Vote: The Disputed Presidential Election of 1876 (UP of Kansas, 2008).
 Robinson, Lloyd. The Stolen Election: Hayes versus Tilden—1876 (Macmillan, 2001) online.

Primary sources 
 Chester, Edward W A guide to political platforms (1977) pp 97–102 online
91

External links 
 Democratic Party Platform of 1876 at The American Presidency Project
 Official proceedings of the National Democratic convention, held in St. Louis, Mo., June 27th, 28th and 29th, 1876

1876 conferences
1876 United States presidential election
1876 in Missouri
19th century in St. Louis
Conventions in St. Louis
Political conventions in Missouri
Missouri Democratic Party
Democratic National Conventions
June 1876 events